Bezanjerd is a village in Rostaq Rural District, in the Central District of Khalilabad County, Razavi Khorasan Province, Iran. At the 2006 census, its population was 1,289, in 350 families.

See also 

 List of cities, towns and villages in Razavi Khorasan Province

References 

Populated places in Khalilabad County